The 2021 season is Clube de Regatas do Flamengo's 126th year of existence, their 110th football season, and their 51st in the Campeonato Brasileiro Série A, having never been relegated from the top division. In addition to the 2021 Campeonato Brasileiro Série A, Flamengo will also compete in the CONMEBOL Copa Libertadores, the Copa do Brasil, and the Campeonato Carioca, the top tier of Rio de Janeiro's state football league and Supercopa do Brasil.

Kits
Supplier: Adidas / Sponsor: Banco BRB / Back of the shirt: Mercado Livre  / Lower back: TotalEnergies / Shoulder: Sportsbet.io / Sleeves: Havan / Numbers: TIM / Shorts: ABC da Construção / Socks: MOSS

Pre-season and friendlies
Due to the reorganization of the Brazilian calendar caused by the COVID-19 pandemic, the 2021 season started just a week after the end of the 2020 season, making any kind of pre-season or friendly scheduling impossible.

Competitions

Overview

Supercopa do Brasil

Goals and red cards are shown.

Campeonato Carioca

Taça Guanabara

Goals and red cards are shown.

Semi-finals

Finals

Copa Libertadores

Group stage

Goals and red cards are shown.

Round of 16

The draw for the round of 16 was held on 1 June 2021.

Quarter-finals

Semi-finals

Final

Goals and red cards are shown.

Campeonato Brasileiro

On 24 March 2021 the Brazilian Football Confederation announced the 2021 Campeonato Brasileiro Série A schedule with Flamengo opening the league against Palmeiras at Maracanã Stadium.

League table

Results by round

Matches
Goals and red cards are shown.

Copa do Brasil

As Flamengo will participate in the 2021 Copa Libertadores, the club will enter the Copa do Brasil in the third round.

Third round

Goals and red cards are shown.

Round of 16
Goals and red cards are shown.

Quarter-finals
Goals and red cards are shown.

Semi-finals
Goals and red cards are shown.

Management team

Roster

Transfers and loans

Transfers in

Loan in

Transfers out

Loan out

Statistics
Players in italics have left the club before the end of the season.

Appearances

Goalscorers

Assists

Clean sheets

Season records

Individual
 Most matches played in the season in all competitions: 63 – Vitinho
 Most League matches played in the season: 35 – Michael
 Most matches played as starter in the season in all competitions: 54 – Willian Arão
 Most League matches played as starter in the season: 29 – Willian Arão
 Most matches played as substitute in the season in all competitions: 32 – Vitinho
 Most League matches played as substitute in the season: 15 – Rodinei
 Most goals in the season in all competitions: 34 – Gabriel Barbosa
 Most League goals in the season: 14 – Michael
 Most clean sheets in the season in all competitions: 19 – Diego Alves
 Most League clean sheets in the season: 9 – Diego Alves
 Most goals scored in a match: 3
 Pedro vs Volta Redonda, Campeonato Carioca, 1 May 2021
 Gabriel Barbosa vs Bahia, Série A, 18 July 2021
 Bruno Henrique vs São Paulo, Série A, 25 July 2021
 Gabriel Barbosa vs Santos, Série A, 28 August 2021
 Goals in consecutive matches in all competitions: 4 consecutive match(es)
 Michael, 5 November 2021 to 14 November 2021
 Goals in consecutive League matches: 4 consecutive match(es)
 Michael, 5 November 2021 to 14 November 2021
 Fastest goal: 23 seconds
 Gabriel Barbosa vs São Paulo, Série A, 14 November 2021
 Hat-tricks:
 Pedro vs Volta Redonda, Campeonato Carioca, 1 May 2021
 Gabriel Barbosa vs Bahia, Série A, 18 July 2021
 Bruno Henrique vs São Paulo, Série A, 25 July 2021
 Gabriel Barbosa vs Santos, Série A, 28 August 2021

Team
 Biggest home win in all competitions:
 6–0 vs ABC, Copa do Brasil, 29 July 2021
 Biggest League home win:
 5–1 v São Paulo, Série A, 25 July 2021
 Biggest away win in all competitions:
 5–0 vs Bahia, Série A, 18 July 2021
 Biggest League away win:
 5–0 v Bahia, Série A, 18 July 2021
 Biggest home loss in all competitions:
 0–4 vs Internacional, Série A, 8 August 2021
 Biggest League home loss:
 0–4 v Internacional, Série A, 8 August 2021
 Biggest away loss in all competitions:
 0–2 vs Atlético Goianiense, Série A, 9 December 2021
 Biggest League away loss:
 1–2 v Atlético Goianiense, Série A, 9 December 2021
 Highest scoring match in all competitions:
 5–1 vs Madureira, Campeonato Carioca, 5 April 2021
 5–1 vs São Paulo, Série A, 25 July 2021
 6–0 vs ABC, Copa do Brasil, 29 July 2021
 5–1 vs Olimpia, Copa Libertadores, 18 August 2021
 Highest scoring League match:
 5–1 vs São Paulo, Série A, 25 July 2021
 Longest winning run in all competitions: 8 consecutive matches
 11 July 2021 to 5 August 2021
 Longest League winning run: 4 consecutive matches
 11 July 2021 to 1 August 2021
 11 November 2021 to 20 November 2021
 Longest unbeaten run in all competitions: 17 consecutive matches
 17 April 2021 to 16 June 2021
 Longest League unbeaten run: 11 consecutive matches
 30 October 2021 to 3 December 2021
 Longest losing run in all competitions: 2 consecutive matches
 4 July 2021 to 7 July 2021
 6 December 2021 to 9 December 2021
 Longest League losing run: 2 consecutive matches
 4 July 2021 to 7 July 2021
6 December 2021 to 9 December 2021
 Longest without win run in all competitions: 4 consecutive matches
 28 August 2021 to 15 September 2021
 Longest without League win run: 3 consecutive matches
 3 December 2021 to 9 December 2021
 Longest scoring run in all competitions: 19 consecutive matches
 19 March 2021 to 22 May 2021
 Longest League scoring run: 12 consecutive matches
 23 October 2021 to 3 December 2021 
 Longest without scoring run in all competitions: 2 consecutive matches
 6 December 2021 to 9 December 2021
 Longest League without scoring run: 2 consecutive matches
 6 December 2021 to 9 December 2021
 Longest conceding goals run in all competitions: 7 consecutive matches
 5 April 2021 to 27 April 2021
 20 November 2021 to 9 December 2021
 Longest League conceding goals run: 6 consecutive matches
 20 November 2021 to 9 December 2021
 Longest without conceding goals run in all competitions: 5 consecutive matches
 27 May 2021 to 16 June 2021
 Longest League without conceding goals run: 3 consecutive matches
 11 November 2021 to 17 November 2021

National Team statistics

Appearances and goals while playing for Flamengo.

Individual awards

Notes

References

External links
 Clube de Regatas do Flamengo
 Flamengo official website (in Portuguese)

Brazilian football clubs 2021 season
CR Flamengo seasons